Roberto Sanz (born 11 May 1908, date of death unknown) was a Spanish boxer. He competed in the men's lightweight event at the 1928 Summer Olympics. At the 1928 Summer Olympics, he lost to Carlo Orlandi of Italy.

References

1908 births
Year of death missing
Spanish male boxers
Olympic boxers of Spain
Boxers at the 1928 Summer Olympics
People from Vall d'Albaida
Sportspeople from the Province of Valencia
Lightweight boxers